Home health may refer to:

 Home care
 Home health nursing
 House call